Harriette Wilson (2 February 1786 – 10 March 1845) was the author of The Memoirs of Harriette Wilson: Written by Herself (1825). Wilson was a famed British Regency courtesan who became the mistress of William, Lord Craven, at the age of 15. Later in her career, she went on to have formal relationship arrangements with Arthur Wellesley, 1st Duke of Wellington, and other significant politicians.

Early life 
Harriette Dubouchet's birth at 2 Carrington Street, in Shepherd Market, Mayfair, London, was recorded in the parish register of St George, Hanover Square. Her father kept a small shop with his wife, Amelia, née Cook. Her father is said to have assumed the surname of Wilson about 1801.

One of the fifteen children of Swiss John James Dubouchet (or De Bouchet), Wilson was one of four sisters in the family who pursued careers as concubines. Her sisters Amy, Fanny and Sophia also became courtesans. In her memoir, Wilson claims that Amy sets a poor example for the others, introducing them to their licentious reputations and careers:

We were all virtuous girls when Amy, one fine afternoon, left her father's house and sallied forth, like Don Quixote, in quest of adventures. The first person who addressed her was one Mr. Trench; a certain short-sighted, pedantic man, whom most people know about town. I believe she told him that she was running away from her father. All I know for certain is that, when Fanny and I discovered her abode, we went to visit her, and when we asked her what on earth had induced her to throw herself away on an entire stranger whom she had never seen before, her answer was, "I refused him the whole of the first day; had I done so the second he would have been in a fever."

As the sisters grew more sophisticated in their sexual and social prowess, Harriette began to observe how her eldest sister challenged her. Amy was "often surnamed one of the Furies," as Wilson writes. Amy bore the Duke of Argyll's child later in her life. The duke was one of Harriette's former lovers, demonstrating one example of Amy "stealing" her younger sister's clients. Fanny, in contrast, remained a close friend to Wilson and is described as agreeable. The youngest sister, Sophia, married respectably into the aristocracy, becoming the bride of Lord Berwick at age 17.

Career 
Wilson began her career at the age of fifteen, becoming the mistress of William Craven, 1st Earl of Craven, 7th Baron Craven. Among her other lovers with whom she had financial arrangements was Arthur Wellesley, 1st Duke of Wellington, who commented "publish, and be damned" when informed of her plans to write her memoirs. Wilson even attracted George IV's attention, who claimed he would "do anything to suppress what Harriette had to reveal of [his mistress] Lady Conyngham".

Wilson makes a claim in her memoir about Frederick Lamb, 3rd Viscount Melbourne, assaulting her. She attributes his violent act toward her to the jealousy that she had become acquainted with the Duke of Argyll and a lover, a Lord Ponsonby. According to her account, Lamb attacked her because she refused him. For obvious reasons, most politicians with whom she had relationships paid high sums to keep their interactions with her private.

Her decision to publish was partly based on the broken promises of her lovers to provide her with an income in her older age. The Memoirs of Harriette Wilson, Written By Herself, first published in 1825, is celebrated for the opening line: "I shall not say how and why I became, at the age of fifteen, the mistress of the Earl of Craven." It was reprinted by the Navarre Society in 1924, as was a follow-up title Paris Lions and London Tigers (1825) with an introduction by Heywood Hill in 1935, although how much of this latter title was the work of Harriette Wilson herself is debatable.

Legacy 
Despite modern speculations that Wilson was mistress to the Prince George, Prince of Wales, there is no evidence of such in her memoir. She records a time when, while still serving as a courtesan to Lord Craven, she writes a letter to the Prince of Wales: "I am told that I am very beautiful, so perhaps you would like to see me." She speculates that the response from the prince requesting her visit arrives via Colonel Thomas. Indignant that the prince would request she travel to meet him, she responds:

SIR,— To travel fifty-two miles this bad weather, merely to see a man, with only the given number of legs, arms, fingers, &c., would, you must admit, be madness in a girl like myself, surrounded by humble admirers who are ever ready to travel any distance for the honour of kissing the tip of her little finger; but, if you can prove to me that you are one bit better than any man who may be ready to attend my bidding, I'll e'en start for London directly. So, if you can do anything better in the way of pleasing a lady than ordinary men, write directly: if not, adieu, Monsieur le Prince.

Wilson's clients were politically associated with the Prince of Wales, but in her memoir she does not record meeting or bedding him. However, it is said that "Wilson reminds us that the long-term mistress of the Prince of Wales, having been promised £20,000 which never materialised, died a pauper." Wilson might not have met the man or bedded him, but she was aware that the Prince of Wales, like the many other politicians, did not ultimately financially support their courtesans—and her memoir represents this controversial failing of English officeholders.

Fictional portrayal 
 Harriette Wilson appears in the Jane Austen mystery novel, Jane and the Barque of Frailty, by Stephanie Barron. (Harriette and Jane Austen were contemporaries.)
 Harriette Wilson's memoirs Publish and Be Damn'd: The Memoirs of Harriette Wilson was adapted for the BBC Radio 4 series Classic Serial by Ellen Dryden and broadcast in June 2012

References

Sources 
Frances Wilson (2003) The Courtesan's Revenge: The Life of Harriette Wilson, the Woman Who Blackmailed the King. London: Faber & Faber 
Harriette Wilson's Memoirs: The Greatest Courtesan of her Age; selected and edited with an introduction by Lesley Blanch. London: John Murray, 1957
Valerie Grosvenor Myer (with an introduction by Sue Limb): Harriette Wilson, Lady of Pleasure. Ely: Fern House, 1999
Kenyon-Jones, Christine. (2003, August 23). Poetic Licentiousness. Retrieved from https://www.theguardian.com/books/2003/aug/24/biography.features

External links 
 
 
 The Memoirs of Harriette Wilson, Volumes One and Two by Harriette Wilson – Project Gutenberg
 The Memoirs Of Harriette Wilson Volume I – Internet Archive
 The Memoirs Of Harriette Wilson Written By Herself Volume Two – Internet Archive
 Short biography and picture
 Guardian biography review

1786 births
British memoirists
English courtesans
People from Mayfair
Women of the Regency era
1845 deaths
British women memoirists
People from Somers Town, London
19th-century English women writers
19th-century memoirists